Rattlesnake! is the fourth and final studio album by post-hardcore band A Static Lullaby. The album was released through Fearless Records on September 9, 2008. The album was produced by Steve Evetts who also produced all previous albums by A Static Lullaby except for Faso Latido which was produced by Lou Giordano (Taking Back Sunday, The Color Fred). It is their first release to carry the Parental Advisory sticker. This is the last album released by the band before their break-up in January 2012.

Background

This is the first album to be released by the group as a four-piece band. The former second guitarist, John Martinez, left A Static Lullaby on good terms and was not replaced. This is also the first album with new drummer, Tyler Mahurin. The band has been playing three songs off the record on their Party Star tour: "Rattlesnake!", "The Pledge", and "The Prestige".

The song "The Pledge" features guest vocals by  Greg Puciato (Dillinger Escape Plan).

Rattlesnake band

During a live interview on the website Stickam (a website for those with webcams) before the release of the album their current bassist Dane Poppin (who recorded on the album) was said to be replaced by a name from a fictitious band called Rattlesnake. The band said that the album was named after the band and that the bassist from Rattlesnake (who appeared in the interview) was to fill in for a while. Halfway through the interview the band revealed that they had pranked all those watching. Dane was wearing a fake mustache, playing the part of the fake Rattlesnake bassist and the band also admitted that they made up Rattlesnake. The band also admitted that it would be funny if they learned of Britney Spears having heard their cover of Toxic.

Track listing 
All lyrics written by Joe Brown and Dan Arnold, all music composed by A Static Lullaby

Personnel

A Static Lullaby
Joe Brown – unclean vocals
Dan Arnold – clean vocals, piano, programming, keyboards, guitar
Dane Poppin – bass guitar, backing vocals
Tyler Mahurin – drums, percussion

Additional personnel
Greg Puciato – vocals on track 8
Matt Wheeler – vocals on track 10
Produced, engineered, and mixed by Steve Evetts
Mastered by Alan Douches
Art direction and design by Sons of Nero
Bob Becker – A&R

References 

2008 albums
A Static Lullaby albums
Fearless Records albums
Albums produced by Steve Evetts
Albums with cover art by Sons of Nero